Cirphis or Kirphis or Kirfis is a mountain in Greece north of the Bay of Antikyra in the Gulf of Corinth. It is separated from Mount Parnassus by the valley of the Pleistos. In antiquity, it was reckoned as part of the district of Phocis.

References

Geography of ancient Phocis
Cirphis